Goulart is a Portuguese-language surname of French roots, common in Portugal and Brazil (with a variant spelled Gularte). There is also a variant from Hoeilart, which is a Flemish surname popular in the Azores Islands and adapted to Portuguese as Goulart.

Goulart may refer to:

People
Alexandre Goulart (born 1976), Brazilian footballer
Gefferson da Silva Goulart (born 1978), Brazilian footballer
Izabel Goulart (born 1984), Brazilian model
João Goulart (1918–1976), Brazilian politician and president
Luiz Bombonato Goulart (born 1975), Brazilian footballer
Maria Teresa Fontela Goulart (born 1940), former Brazilian first lady
Mário Goulart Lino, Portuguese footballer
Paulo Goulart (1933–2014), Brazilian actor
Ricardo Goulart (born 1991), Brazilian-born Chinese footballer
Ron Goulart (1933–2022), American writer and critic
Simon Goulart (1543–1628), French Reformed theologian
Walter de Souza Goulart (1912–1951), Brazilian footballer

Other
Evelina M. Goulart (schooner), fishing schooner

Portuguese-language surnames
French-language surnames